Nachtblut ("night blood" in German) is a German gothic metal band formed in Osnabrück in 2005. They signed a deal with Napalm Records for their third album. In 2013 they performed during Wacken Open Air and Summer Breeze Open Air. In 2014, 2017, and 2022 Nachtblut lined up Wave-Gotik-Treffen festival in Leipzig. To date, Nachtblut has released six studio albums.
In October 2020 Nachtblut released their sixth album called Vanitas. Vanitas had 500 special edition wooden boxes with playing Cards, leather wrist band, a Satanic certificate in addition to the album itself.

Members

Current members 

 Skoll – drums (2005–present)
 Greif – guitars (2005–present)
 Askeroth – vocals (2005–present)
 Ablaz – bass (2016–present)
 Amelie – keyboards (2016–present)

Former members 

 Sacerdos – bass, backing vocals (?-2012)
 Lymania – keyboards (2006–2015)
 Trym – bass (2012–2016)

Discography 

 Das Erste Abendmahl (self-release, 2007)
 Antik (self-release, 2011 reissued by Napalm Records with bonus material, 2009)
 Dogma (Napalm Records, 2012)
 Chimonas (Napalm Records, 2014)
 Apostasie (Napalm Records, 2017)
 Vanitas (2020)

References

External links 
 
 Metal Storm
 Metal.it
 2017 Album Review – Metal Hammer
 Sputnikmusic
 Album Review – Metal.de

Musical groups established in 2005
Musical quintets
German black metal musical groups